Cauca culture (800–1200 CE) is a  pre-Columbian culture from the Valle del Cauca in Colombia, named for the Cauca River. Middle Cauca culture dates from the 9 to 10th centuries CE.

Their territory was near the present day city of Popayán, in the Calima River Valley.

Society
Archaeologists surmise that Cauca culture was organized into several related chiefdoms that trades and fought with each other. They farmed and made ceramics and goldwork.

Artwork
Their art often featured avian imagery. Cauca culture art shared some similarities to Yotoco culture art. They are known for ceramic slab figurines, representing humans–both female and male–with dramatically angular features.

Goldwork
Cauca goldsmiths hammered and cast gold to create a range of figures and ornaments, including diadems and bracelets. They created caricuri noserings from gold.

See also 
 Calima culture
 Indigenous peoples in Colombia
 List of pre-Columbian cultures

References

Bibliography 
 Bruhns, Karen Olsen. Ancient South America. Cambridge, UK: Cambridge University Press, 1994. .

External links 
 Cauca culture artwork , National Museum of the American Indian

Circum-Caribbean tribes
Indigenous peoples in Colombia